Pontault-Combault is a commune in the Seine-et-Marne department in the Île-de-France region in north-central France. It is located in the eastern suburbs of Paris,  from the center of Paris.

History
The commune of Pontault-Combault was created in 1839 by the merger of the commune of Pontault with the commune of Combault. The commune town hall (mairie) is located in Combault.

Before this merger, the commune of Pontault had already annexed the commune of Berchères at the time of the French Revolution.

Transport
Pontault-Combault is served by Émerainville–Pontault-Combault station on Paris  .

Demographics
The inhabitants are called  Pontellois-Combalusiens.

See also
Communes of the Seine-et-Marne department

References

External links

Official site 
1999 Land Use, from IAURIF (Institute for Urban Planning and Development of the Paris-Île-de-France région) 

Communes of Seine-et-Marne